HD 13931 is a Sun-like star in the northern constellation of Andromeda. It can be viewed with binoculars or a small telescope but is too faint to be seen with the naked eye, having an apparent visual magnitude of 7.60. This object is located at a distance of 154 light years from the Sun, as determined from its parallax, and is drifting further away with a radial velocity of +31 km/s.

This is an ordinary G-type main-sequence star with a stellar classification of G0V, which indicates it, like the Sun, is generating energy through core hydrogen fusion. It is slightly larger, hotter, brighter, and more massive than the Sun. The metal content is about 8% greater than the Sun, and it has a quiet (magnetically inactive) chromosphere. The star is an estimated 6.8 billion years old and it is spinning with a rotation period of about 26 days

In 2009, a very long-period giant planet, more massive than Jupiter, was found in orbit around the star by measuring changes in the star's radial velocity. The planet's eccentricity (0.02) is about the same as Earth. In 2023, the inclination and true mass of HD 13931 b were measured via astrometry.

According to a 2018 research, HD 13931 is the most promising Solar System analogue known, since it has a star similar to the Sun and a planet with mass and semimajor axis similar to Jupiter. Those characteristics yield a probability almost 75% for the existence of a dynamically stable habitable zone, where an Earth-like planet may exist and sustain life.

See also 
 List of extrasolar planets

References 

G-type main-sequence stars
Planetary systems with one confirmed planet
Andromeda (constellation)
BD+43 0459
013931
010626